Aileen Pringle (born Aileen Bisbee; July 23, 1895 – December 16, 1989) was an American stage and film actress during the silent film era.

Biography

Early life
Born into a prominent and wealthy San Francisco family and educated in Europe, Pringle began her acting career shortly after her 1916 marriage to Charles McKenzie Pringle, the son of a wealthy titled British Jamaican landowner and a member of the Privy and Legislative Councils of Jamaica.

Career rise
One of Pringle's first high-profile roles was in the Rudolph Valentino film Stolen Moments (1920). Many of Pringle's early roles were only modestly successful, and she continued to build her career until the early 1920s when she was selected by friend and romance novelist Elinor Glyn to star in the 1924 film adaptation of her novel Three Weeks with matinee idol Conrad Nagel. The role catapulted Pringle into leading-lady status and her career began to build momentum.

Scandal

On November 15, 1924, a Sunday, Pringle was among a select group of Hollywood elites who boarded the Oneida, a yacht owned by newspaper scion and billionaire William Randolph Hearst, in San Pedro, California,. The event was a 42nd-birthday party organized by Hearst for film producer and director Thomas Ince.

Other prominent guests included columnist Louella Parsons, actor Charlie Chaplin, actress Marion Davies (who was also Hearst's lover) and actresses Seena Owen, Jacqueline Logan and Julanne Johnston.

Early Monday morning, Ince was taken from the yacht by water taxi and brought ashore, accompanied by Dr. Goodman a licensed, though non-practicing, physician. By Tuesday night, Ince was dead.
Ince's death was ruled to have been caused by a gastro-intestinal illness, but the press frenzy that followed turned the event into a Hollywood legend; with various enigmatic and lurid stories being proffered by gossips. Among these, was a story of Hearst accidentally shooting Ince while aiming for Chaplin, who he believed to be having an affair with Marion Davies. Pringle's career weathered the controversy.

Later career

Pringle's acting career continued throughout the early 1920s, however, she allegedly was disliked by many of her co-workers for her allegedly haughty and dismissive behavior. She was prone to make witty, sometimes caustic, comments on Hollywood and her fellow actors. During a romantic scene in Three Weeks, in which actor Conrad Nagel carried her in his arms to the bedroom, lip readers saw her say: "If you drop me, you bastard, I'll break your neck".  Pringle's apparent disdain for her profession began to hurt her career, and by the late 1920s her roles became fewer.

During the late silent and early period of talking pictures, Pringle co-starred in a series of light films with actor Lew Cody, including Adam and Evil (1927), Tea for Three (1927), Wickedness Preferred (1928), The Baby Cyclone (1928), Beau Broadway (1928), A Single Man (1929) and By Appointment Only (1933). Of Pringle’s performance in Adam and Evil, Mourdant Hall in the August 9, 1927 edition of The New York Times wrote, “Evelyn Trevelyn, the Eve of this tale, is alluded to by Ralph Spence is (sic) one of the titles as a “spare rib.” She is impersonated by Aileen Pringle and therefore is an asset to the scenes.” 

Although disliked by some Hollywood insiders, Aileen Pringle often was dubbed by the press as the "Darling of the Intelligentsia" because of her close friendship with such literary figures as Carl Van Vechten, Joseph Hergesheimer, Rupert Hughes, and H.L. Mencken who became a lifelong friend of the actress. She brokered the meeting of Mencken and Valentino, of which Mencken wrote an account, some weeks after Valentino had died. Mencken does not name her but describes her as "discreet as she is charming." Ralph Barton, American artist, was also a devoted friend and used her as the model for Dorothy in his illustrations for Gentlemen Prefer Blondes by Anita Loos.   
Another admirer was George Gershwin who met her in Hollywood and wrote much of the Second Rhapsody at her Santa Monica, California, home. Her wit, keen intellect and sparkling personality made her a sought-after companion.

After her 1926 divorce from Charles Pringle, Aileen Pringle further focused on her acting career, including Dream of Love (1928) with Joan Crawford and Wall Street (1929) co-starring Ralph Ince, brother of Thomas Ince. However, with the advent of sound film, the studios heavily began promoting a new crop of starlets and Pringle's career faded.

During the sound era, she continued to take small parts in major films and even uncredited roles. In 1944 Pringle married the author James M. Cain, but the union lasted only two years and ended in divorce. By the late 1940s, Pringle retired from the screen and lived a wealthy retirement in New York City, where she died in 1989 at the age of 94.

For her contribution to the motion picture industry, Aileen Pringle was awarded a star on the Hollywood Walk of Fame at 6723 Hollywood Blvd. in Los Angeles, California.

Filmography

References
Notes

Bibliography
 Kenneth Anger, "Hollywood Babylon", San Francisco California: Straight Arrow Books, 1975. 
 "Films In Review", October 1979, Vol.XXX No.8. Article on Aileen Pringle by De Witt Bodeen. ISSN 0015-1688.
 "Films In Review", March 1990, Vol.XLI No.3. Article on Aileen Pringle by Stuart Oderman. ISSN 0015-1688
Rodgers, Marion Elizabeth (2005) Mencken: The American Iconoclast. Oxford University Press. 
Bruce Kellner. The Last Dandy: Ralph Barton, American Artist, 1891-1931. Columbia: University of Missouri Press, 1991.

External links

Aileen Pringle at Silent Ladies & Gents
Aileen Pringle Papers. Yale Collection of American Literature, Beinecke Rare Book and Manuscript Library.
Aileen Pringle at Virtual History

American film actresses
American silent film actresses
Actresses from California
Actresses from San Francisco
1895 births
1989 deaths
Burials at Woodlawn Cemetery (Bronx, New York)
20th-century American actresses